"You're Not Alone" is a song written by Jim Scott and recorded by the band Chicago for their 1988 album Chicago 19, with Bill Champlin singing lead vocals. When released as a single early the following year, the song peaked at #10 on the U.S. Billboard Hot 100.

There are two versions of this song:  the album version and the radio remix with additional production. The radio remix version features significantly more guitar work by studio guitarist and former Giant lead vocalist/guitarist Dann Huff.

References

1989 singles
Chicago (band) songs
1988 songs
Reprise Records singles
Song recordings produced by Ron Nevison
Full Moon Records singles